Stella Bella Wines is an Australian winery based at Margaret River, in the Margaret River wine region of Western Australia.

History
The winery was established in July 1996, when Stuart Pym, then a winemaker at Voyager Estate, and Janice McDonald leased a vineyard, with investor support.  Its first wines were produced during the 1997 vintage.

By 2009, Australian wine writer James Halliday was rating the winery as one of the Margaret River region's best.

Wines
Stella Bella has four brands.  They range from Skuttlebutt, an everyday wine launched in 2004, through the classic Stella Bella and premium / ultra-premium Suckfizzle ranges, to the winery's most exalted brand, Series Luminosa, launched in 2010.

See also

 Australian wine
 List of wineries in Western Australia
 Western Australian wine

References

Notes

Bibliography

External links
Stella Bella Wines – official site

Food and drink companies established in 1996
Margaret River, Western Australia
Wineries in Western Australia
1996 establishments in Australia